Dartchery at the 1976 Summer Paralympics consisted of three events.

Medal summary

References 

 

1976 Summer Paralympics events
1976